The National Monuments of Eswatini, in Southern Africa, are proclaimed in accordance with the National Trust Commission Act, 1972. The same act saw the establishment of the Swaziland National Trust Commission. The Commission, a parastatal of the Ministry of Tourism and Environmental Affairs, is charged with the protection and promotion of the country's cultural heritage. As of May 2012, three National Monuments have been proclaimed with a number of candidate sites for future proclamation under examination. Swaziland ratified the UNESCO World Heritage Convention in 2006; the Ngwenya Mines have been submitted for inscription and are currently on the Tentative List.

List of National Monuments
Three National Monuments have been proclaimed under the current system:

List of potential National Monuments
A further twenty-nine sites have been identified as potential National Monuments:

See also
 History of Swaziland
 List of heritage registers
 UNESCO General History of Africa

References

National Monuments
Heritage registers in Eswatini
Eswatini